Kudzwai Dube (born 16 December 1999) is a South African rugby union player for the  in the Currie Cup. His regular position is prop.

Dube was named in the  side for the 2022 Currie Cup Premier Division.

References

South African rugby union players
Living people
Rugby union props
Griquas (rugby union) players
1999 births